Sialkot Cantonment (Urdu: سیالکوٹ چھاؤنی) is a military cantonment area in Sialkot adjacent to the city. It is one of the oldest and most important Cantonments of Pakistan. It was established in 1852 by the British Indian Army. As gleaned from the old records, the Sialkot Cantonment is the precursor of Wazirabad Garrison which was established for a sojourn from 1849–52. The site of Sialkot Cantonment was chosen by Sir Charles Napier, GCB, the then Commander-in-Chief, in 1851. The Wazirabad Cantonment was vacated and the garrison shifted to "Seealkot Cantt", as it was then called, where actual occupation was in effect in 1852. "Cantt" is an abbreviation for cantonment.

Geography
The congenial climate, prospects of meeting military requisites and close proximity to the Jammu and Kashmir state led to the genesis of Sialkot Cantt. The Sialkot Cantonment is primarily flanked by two rivulets called "nullas" in vernacular, i.e. nullah "Palkhu" towards the north and nullah "Bhed" towards the south, both originating from the Indian Kashmir.

Demography
The Cantonment also serves as a military base and residential establishment. The civil population of Sialkot Cantonment is approximately 191,000 with parent city Sialkot's population was 656,730 per the 2017 census. The cantonment maintains its own infrastructure of civic facilities and is outside the jurisdiction of the Sialkot District Government. Its civic facilities are managed by Sialkot Cantonment Board. Sialkot Cantonment houses two divisions of infantry. There is also a small Sialkot Cantonment Airport in Sialkot Cantt which is in use by Army aviation. Sialkot area is famous for producing light industrial products, mainly for export purposes, including surgical instruments, leather goods and sporting gods.

See also
 Army Cantonment Board, Pakistan
 Cantonment
 Pakistan Army 
 Sialkot
 Sialkot Cantonment Board

References

External links

Sialkot
Cantonments of Pakistan